Lithuanian Floorball Federation is the governing body for floorball in the country of Lithuania. It was founded on 7 May 2010.

Five floorball teams are officially LGRF members.

References

External links 
official website

Floorball
Floorball in Lithuania
2010 establishments in Lithuania